Herpetogramma luctuosalis is a moth in the family Crambidae. It was described by Achille Guenée in 1854. It is found in Siberia, Malaysia, India, Taiwan and China.

References

Moths described in 1854
Herpetogramma
Moths of Asia